The 2008 Dr McKenna Cup was a Gaelic football competition played under the auspices of Ulster GAA. The tournament was won by Down. They defeated Derry in the final. Down won despite not winning any of their games in the 2007 edition of the competition, and also had not won any of their games in the 2007 National Football League.

Summary
In 2008, the competition was compacted entirely into the month of January. This led to several considerations for all participants, because the students in the university teams had exams in January, while the county teams, who would not have played together for up to six months, had to play three matches in a week. In spite of this, the university teams seemed to have a slight advantage, causing several upsets early in the competition.

Donegal knocked out holders Tyrone.

In the 2008 semi-finals Derry defeated Fermanagh and Down defeated Cavan.

Teams
Counties
 Antrim
 Armagh
 Cavan
 Derry
 Donegal
 Down
 Fermanagh
 Monaghan
 Tyrone

Universities
 Queen's University Belfast
 St Mary's University College
 University of Ulster, Jordanstown

See also
 2008 O'Byrne Cup

References

Dr McKenna Cup
Dr McKenna Cup
Dr McKenna Cup seasons